Bang Rachan is a tambon (subdistrict) of Khai Bang Rachan District, in Sing Buri Province, Thailand. In 2014 it had a total population of 7,382 people. The subdistrict is named after the historical village Bang Rachan.

Administration

Central administration
The tambon is subdivided into 11 administrative villages (muban).

Local administration
The whole area of the subdistrict is covered by the subdistrict administrative organization (SAO) Khai Bang Rachan (องค์การบริหารส่วนตำบลค่ายบางระจัน)

References

External links
Thaitambon.com on Bang Rachan

Tambon of Sing Buri Province
Populated places in Sing Buri province